Surry Hills, an electoral district of the Legislative Assembly in the Australian state of New South Wales had two incarnations, from 1904 until 1920 and from 1927 until 1930.


Election results

Elections in the 1920s

1927

1920 - 1927

Elections in the 1910s

1917

1913

1910

1907

1906 by-election

1904

Notes

References

New South Wales state electoral results by district